United Hatzalah ("united rescue" in Hebrew: איחוד הצלה) is an Israeli free, volunteer-based emergency medical services (EMS) organization throughout Israel with its headquarters based in Jerusalem.  Its mission is to provide immediate medical intervention during the critical window between the onset of an emergency and the arrival of traditional ambulance assistance. It is one of many Hatzalah organizations in various parts of the world and the only one that includes women and non-Jewish volunteers.

United Hatzalah of Israel was founded in 2006 with the merger of several small local hatzalah organizations. It has grown to become the largest independent, non-profit, fully volunteer EMS organization in the world, with over 6,200 volunteer medical first responders nationwide, and additional chapters in Panama, the United States, and Ukraine. The organization provides free services to all citizens regardless of race, religion, or national origin. With the help of its Uber-like GPS dispatch system and fleet of rapid response ambucycles, United Hatzalah has achieved an average response time of less than 3 minutes nationwide and 90 seconds in metropolitan areas.

United Hatzalah's national command center in Jerusalem uses an advanced GPS-based dispatch technology to identify the closest and most qualified volunteers and routes them to the scene of an emergency through a mobile device application.  Approximately 1,000 volunteers are outfitted with medically equipped motorcycles “ambucycles” capable of navigating around traffic jams to reach victims in as few as 90 seconds. The remaining volunteers respond to emergencies using their own private cars, or organizational emergency e-bikes, ambuboats, or ATVs, depending upon the location of the emergency. The organization is funded exclusively through private charitable support.

Within Israel, individuals may contact United Hatzalah through its direct number, 1221; however, some dispatch information is received directly from national ambulance services. United Hatzalah in turn alerts and coordinates with local ambulances, Search and Rescue (SAR), fire, and police services, and the IDF, when necessary.

History 
As a young EMT in Jerusalem, Eli Beer recognized that heavy urban traffic and narrow streets often prevented ambulances from arriving in time to save a victim.

Initially, volunteers responded to fewer than 200 calls per day by monitoring two-way emergency radio scanners.  As cellular technology evolved, volunteers migrated to a managed push-to-talk network, which enabled two-way communications between dispatchers and volunteer medics.

After the Second Lebanon War (Hebrew: מלחמת לבנון השנייה, Milhemet Levanon HaShniya) in 2006, Beer brought together more than 50 independent Hatzalah organizations to form United Hatzalah of Israel.

In 2008 United Hatzalah developed the LifeCompass GPS dispatch technology and mobile app medley capable of tracking the location of volunteers in real time, assessing the unique capabilities, mobility and equipment of the closest volunteers, and routing the most appropriate medics to any given emergency.  Today, all volunteers receive a standard-issue smartphone linked to the second generation LifeCompass 2.0 command-and-control system.

Results and Demographics 
United Hatzalah currently responds to approximately 1,800 calls per day and as many as 2,500 calls during large-scale emergencies such as the 2014 Israel–Gaza Conflict.  In 2019, the organization answered more than 650,000 calls, with a volunteer corps of 6,000 medics, and a fleet of 1,000 ambucycles.

United Hatzalah's lifesaving model has reduced average first-response time to three minutes. Sudden cardiac arrest calls are the best measure of emergency medical performance.  Since United Hatzalah's inception, the rate of cardiac-arrest deaths has decreased by 50%, according to the Israel Heart Society.  At 46.4 deaths per 100,000 people, the World Health Organization reported in 2011 that Israel ranks 12th best out of 192 countries in terms of coronary-related mortality.

United Hatzalah's volunteer base in 2018 is approximately 60% Jewish Religious, 30% Jewish Secular and 10% Minorities (Muslim, Christian and Druze).

Awards and recognition
In recognition of his dedication to save lives and efforts to create a multicultural, apolitical EMS organization, Eli Beer, on behalf of United Hatzalah, has received numerous international accolades, including the Schwab Foundation for Social Entrepreneurship Social Entrepreneur Award (2010), the Israeli Presidential Award for Volunteerism (2011), the World Economic Forum (WEF) Young Global Leader award (2012), the Institute of International Education's Victor J. Goldberg Prize (2013), the OMETZ Social Responsibility Award (2015), the World Values Network Champion of Human Life Award (2016) and the Conference of European Rabbis Internet Entrepreneur Prize (2017).

In April 2013, Eli Beer presented a TedMed talk titled, "The fastest ambulance? A motorcycle," in which he describes the circumstances that led to him to re-imagine first-response medicine by training volunteer EMTs to respond to local emergencies and stabilize victims until official help arrives.  The video has been viewed more than a million times to date.

During the March 2015 American-Israel Public Affairs Committee (AIPAC) Policy Conference in Washington DC, United Hatzalah was honored as a featured innovator in AIPAC's Innovation Showcase, serving to highlight emerging technology developed in Israel but with worldwide impact.

United Hatzalah has earned the Israeli Midot Seal of Effectiveness (2015), the GuideStar Platinum Participant status (2016) and Charity Navigator Four Star Rating (2016) for its operational professionalism and transparent management.

International Aid 

In addition to providing emergency medical services in Israel, United Hatzalah has been active in providing medical care, humanitarian aid, and psychological first aid, in numerous international disasters. The organization sent teams to Haiti multiple times, Nepal after the earthquake in 2015 as well as assisting after Hurricanes Irma and Harvey in 2017 in the United States.

The organization's Psychotrauma and Crisis Response Unit also responded to the Pittsburgh Tree of Life Synagogue Shooting in 2018, and to Miami following the Surfside condominium collapse in 2021. In 2022, the organization undertook a lengthy medical and humanitarian aid mission to Moldova and Ukraine following the Russo-Ukrainian War that involved providing medical and humanitarian aid and food to Ukrainian refugees in Moldova, as well as flying in medications and food for hospitals and communities inside Ukraine, and extracting injured and ill refugees from Ukraine to receive medical treatment in other countries. The organization also chartered a series of planes to bring in food and medical equipment and transport nearly 3,000 Ukrainian refugees to Israel in an operation codenamed Operation Orange Wings.

In February 2023, United Hatzalah assisted in search-and-rescue operations in Turkey following the 2023 Turkey–Syria earthquake, but cut short its mission due intelligence of a "concrete and immediate threat" targeting the group.

See also 
 Eli Beer
 Health care in Israel
 Emergency medical services in Israel

References

External links
 United Hatzalah of Israel Official website
 "Haredi, Arab saving lives together"
 Israel's fast, free and innovative way to save lives
 Forbes India, How An Israeli Organisation Could Help Accident Victims In India
 The Economist, Saving lives - Scattered saviours
 Eli Beer presents at TEDMED
 How He Built The Fastest Ambulance! - YouTube

First aid organizations
Emergency services in Israel
Medical and health organizations based in Israel
Organizations based in Jerusalem
Volunteer organizations in Israel
Jews and Judaism in Israel
2006 establishments in Israel
Organizations established in 2006